On May 18, 2015 a major landslide hit the town of Salgar, in Antioquia, Colombia. At least 78 people died in the disaster, making it the deadliest single-event disaster in Colombia since the 1999 Armenia, Colombia earthquake.

Background
Colombia's rugged terrain and seismic activity make the country susceptible to natural disasters.  From 1975 to 2015, there were about 150 serious disasters, which killed a total of 32,000 people.  Flooding in the mountains is not uncommon, and occasionally leads to serious landslides.  From 2010 to 2011, a series of floods and landslides killed 1,374 people and destroyed more than 100,000 homes.

Landslide
On May 18, 2015 a landslide occurred in La Libordiana region of Colombia.  At around 3 a.m., the landslide went through the Salgar municipality in Antioquia Department.  The landslide occurred after days of rain in the mountains above the town.  The Libordiana River, a tributary of the Cauca River that runs through Salgar, then flooded upstream and triggered the landslide.  The imminent danger was not apparent since the flooding occurred in a forested region where few people live.

A survivor remarked: "People were just screaming everywhere, and I ran to help, but the river was impassable, and all the bridges were covered."  Another said "We ran outside to the road and went into the chapel, and the lights went out and we were in the dark. Then we looked with flashlights and saw that everything was gone."  The force of the landslide destroyed houses and ripped limbs from victims' bodies.  According to Salgar mayor Olga Eugenia Osorio, the town of Santa Margarita, one of four towns that lies within the Salgar municipality, was "erased from the map."

Aftermath
At least 78 people were killed by the landslide. An addition 37 people were injured and as of May 20, 2015, an unknown number of people were still unaccounted for. Dozens of houses and other buildings, including a grade school, remained buried. In total, around 500 people were directly affected by the landslide.
 
The landslide left many bodies disfigured, complicating identification.  Remains recovered from the debris had to be transported to Medellín for identification, three hours from the disaster site.  President Juan Manuel Santos flew to the region to oversee rescue efforts personally.  He promised government assistance of around $6,500 per person to help rebuild Salgar, and declared it a public calamity.  People left homeless by the disaster were provided with food and blankets, as survivors were ordered not to return to the town immediately in case of additional landslides.  At least 15 trucks of portable drinking water were brought into Salgar.  The public was asked to refrain from sending physical donations for disaster relief, but monetary donations were accepted.

See also
https://www.bbc.com/news/world-latin-america-32785201

References

2015 in Colombia
Antioquia Department
Colombian landslide
Colombian landslide 2015
May 2015 events in South America